Log Horizon is a 2013 science fiction, action Japanese anime series based on the novels written by Mamare Touno. A 25-episode anime adaptation produced by Satelight aired on NHK Educational TV from October 5, 2013 to March 22, 2014. The series was streamed as a simulcast by Crunchyroll in North America and other select parts of the world.

A 25-episode second season produced by Studio Deen aired from October 4, 2014 to March 28, 2015. Both seasons have been licensed by Sentai Filmworks in North America for digital and home video release.

A 12-episode third season titled Log Horizon: Destruction of the Round Table (Japanese:ログ・ホライズン 円卓崩壊 Hepburn:Rogu Horaizun Entaku Hōkai) has been released, originally set to premiere in October 2020, it was delayed to Winter 2021 due to the COVID-19 pandemic. The third season aired from January 13, 2021 to March 31, 2021. The third season is named after the title of Volume 12 of the web novel series and the official acronym is DORT. The staff and cast reprised their roles from the second season.

The English dub of the series began broadcasting on ABC Me in Australia on October 23, 2021.

Series overview

Episode list

Season 1 (2013–14)

Season 2 (2014–15)

Season 3: Destruction of the Round Table (2021)

Notes

References

External links
Official anime website 

Log Horizon
Log Horizon (TV series)